Norddeich station may refer to:

 Norddeich station, Norden, Lower Saxony
 Norddeich radio station, Norden, Lower Saxony
 Norddeich Mole station, Norden, Lower Saxony